Following is a list of senators of Seine-Maritime, people who have represented the department of Seine-Maritime in the Senate of France.
The department was known as "Seine-Inférieure" until 1955, when it was given the present more positive-sounding name.

Third Republic

Senators for Seine-Inférieure under the French Third Republic were:

 Gustave Rouland (1876–1878)
 Jules Ancel (1876–1891)
 Pierre Robert (1876–1891)
 Augustin Pouyer-Quertier (1876–1891)
 Pierre Lizot (1882–1891)
 Lucien Dautresme (1891–1892)
 Paul Casimir-Perier (1891–1897)
 Pierre Le Souef (1891–1900)
 Richard Waddington (1891–1913)
 Hippolyte Rouland (1892–1898)
 Jules Siegfried (1897–1900)
 Édouard Fortier (1898–1915)
 Jules Gervais (1900–1909)
 Louis de Montfort (1900–1911)
 Auguste Rispal (1903–1909)
 Raoul Ancel (1909–1911)
 Julien Goujon (1909–1912)
 Louis Quesnel (1912–1927)
 Julien Rouland (1912–1927)
 Louis Brindeau (1912–1936)
 Auguste Leblond (1913–1920)
 Georges Bouctot (1920–1927)
 Robert (Pomereu) (1920–1936)
 Paul Bignon (1927–1932)
 André Lavoinne (1927–1940)
 Gaston Veyssière (1927–1940)
 Robert Thoumyre (1932–1940)
 René Coty (1936–1940)
 Jean Thureau-Dangin (1936–1940)

Fourth Republic

Senators for Seine-Inférieure or Seine-Maritime under the French Fourth Republic were:

 Célestin Dubois (1946–1948)
 Germaine Pican (1946–1948)
 Guy Montier (1946–1948)
 Henri Paumelle (1946–1959)
 Geoffroy (Montalembert) (1946–1959)
 Marcel Léger (1948–1952)
 René Coty (1948–1953)
 Roger Houdet (1952–1959)
 Marcel Lebreton (1954–1959)

Fifth Republic 
Senators for Seine-Maritime under the French Fifth Republic:

References

Sources

 
Lists of members of the Senate (France) by department